Johnnie Morant Jr. (born December 7, 1981) is a former gridiron football wide receiver. He was drafted by the Oakland Raiders in the fifth round of the 2004 NFL Draft. He played college football at Syracuse. He is the former head strength and conditioning coach at East Carter High School. 

Morant was also a member of the Toronto Argonauts and Hamilton Tiger-Cats.

Early years
Born in Newark and raised in Parsippany–Troy Hills, New Jersey, Morant graduated from Parsippany Hills High School in 2000. After an outstanding senior campaign, Morant was rated the best receiver in the East and third best in the nation.

College career
He finished his career at Syracuse University with 88 receptions for 1,535 yards (17.4 avg) and seven touchdowns, adding 524 yards on 22 kickoff returns (23.8 avg) and 35 yards with a score on six carries (5.8 avg) while appearing in 35 games. His 1,535 yards ranks 10th on the school's career-record list, while his 17.4-yard average ranks seventh. Morant also had a string of at least one reception in 29 consecutive games.

Professional career

Oakland Raiders
Morant was selected by the Oakland Raiders in the fifth round (134th overall) of the 2004 NFL Draft. He played three seasons for the team before being released on August 28, 2007.

Toronto Argonauts
On June 22, 2008, Morant signed a contract with the Toronto Argonauts of the Canadian Football League He went on to play in 11 games for the Argonauts.

Hamilton Tiger-Cats
Morant was signed by the Hamilton Tiger-Cats on February 6, 2009. He then retired after the 2009 season.

Coaching career
 2009-2011 Parsippany High School, assistant head coach. 
 2012 Southern Tech, Morant was assistant head coach, offensive coordinator & head strength and conditioning coach
 2013-2014 Kentucky Christian University, head strength and conditioning coach and wide receivers coach
 2015-Present East Carter High School, strength and conditioning coach and wide receivers coach

References

External links
College stats
Hamilton Tiger-Cats bio
Oakland Raiders bio
Toronto Argonauts bio

1981 births
Living people
Parsippany Hills High School alumni
People from Parsippany-Troy Hills, New Jersey
Players of American football from Newark, New Jersey
Players of Canadian football from Newark, New Jersey
American football wide receivers
American players of Canadian football
Canadian football wide receivers
Syracuse Orange football players
Oakland Raiders players
Toronto Argonauts players
Hamilton Tiger-Cats players